The 1973 Iowa Hawkeyes football team represented the University of Iowa in the 1973 Big Ten Conference football season. This was Frank Lauterbur's third and final season as head coach.  It was the first season after Iowa Stadium was renamed to Kinnick Stadium.

Schedule

Roster

References

Iowa
Iowa Hawkeyes football seasons
College football winless seasons
Iowa Hawkeyes football